The 2009–10 Virginia Cavaliers Women's Basketball team represents the University of Virginia in the 2009–2010 NCAA Division I basketball season. The team is coached by Debbie Ryan. The Cavaliers are a member of the Atlantic Coast Conference.

Offseason
August 20: Virginia senior guard Monica Wright was named one of 31 frontrunners for the Women's Wooden Award. During the 2008-09 season, she was the Associated Press honorable mention All-America nod and a spot on the All-ACC first team.
August 25: Kelly Hartig has transferred from the University of Virginia. Hartig appeared in 34 games last season as a sophomore, and started 32.

Regular season

Roster

Schedule

ACC tournament

Player stats

Postseason

NCAA tournament

Awards and honors

Team players drafted into the WNBA

See also
2009–10 ACC women’s basketball season
List of Atlantic Coast Conference women's basketball regular season champions
List of Atlantic Coast Conference women's basketball tournament champions

References

External links
Official Site

Virginia Cavaliers women's basketball seasons
Virginia
Virginia